Thomas Hale (June 24, 1610February 19, 1679) was a founding settler of Hartford, and Norwalk, Connecticut. Thomas was the son of John Hale and Martha MNU, of Watton-on-Stone, Hertfordshire, England.

He likely immigrated with his brother Samuel Hale and sister Martha. Martha married Paul Peck Sr, before 1638, who was also a Hartford founder.

One validation of these siblings comes from the medical journal of Governor John Winthrop, who was also a physician: 
“25 Mar 1666 • Hartford, Connecticut treated: 
Peck, Martha: 45 y. wife of Paule, .... wormes & paine in back & other sickness wch thinks is wind 2 dos 5g N. N. & 8g to take after. She is sis of Sam: Hale of Wethersfield & hath a bro Tho: Hale at Charleston. Sent word it wrought well, but very sick before it wrought.”

Thomas Hale was named a freeman of Massachusetts Bay Colony on May 14, 1634. He came to Hartford with Thomas Hooker's congregation in 1636. He served in the Pequot War, along with his brother Samuel, and was granted fifty acres for his service on October 12, 1671. He married Jane Lord in 1639, in Boston with whom he had one son, Thomas. He was a signer of the Ludlow agreement to settle Norwalk in June 1650. Thomas married Mary Nash in 1659 in Boston with whom he had two children, John and Mary.

Thomas Hale is listed on the Founders Stone bearing the names of the founders of Hartford in the Ancient Burying Ground in Hartford, and he is also listed on the Founders Stone bearing the names of the founders of Norwalk in the East Norwalk Historical Cemetery.

References 

1610 births
1679 deaths
American Puritans
Founders of Hartford, Connecticut
Founding settlers of Norwalk, Connecticut
People from Hertford
Pequot War